Natalia Vitalyevna Vorobieva (born 27 May 1991 in Tulun, Irkutsk Oblast, Russian SFSR, Soviet Union) is a Russian wrestler, who has won the Olympic, World and European titles.

Career 
Vorobieva took up wrestling in her youth, despite some misgivings from her parents.  After winning a number of titles at youth level, Vorobieva proceeded to succeed at senior level in the women's -72 kg freestyle division, beginning with a bronze medal at the 2012 European Championship.  Vorobieva won an unexpected gold at the 2012 Summer Olympics, where she beat five-time World Champion Stanka Zlateva of Bulgaria to win the gold medal.  She was the first Russian to win the -72 kg freestyle title.

In the following, 2013, season, Vorobieva won silver in the women's -72 kg freestyle event at the World Championship, losing in the final to Zhang Fengliu.  Vorobieva won the European title, defeating Maider Unda in the final.

Vorobieva dropped into the -69 kg division when the weight categories were changed at the start of the 2014 season.  Her first season in her new weight class brought a bronze at the World Championship, and victory at the European Championships (defeating Ilana Kratysh in the final).

In the final of the Golden Grand Prix Ivan Yarygin 2015, Vorobieva defeated Ochirbatyn Nasanburmaa of Mongolia. That year, she also won the World title in the women's -69 kg freestyle division, beating Zhou Feng in the final, and won a bronze medal at the European Games.

At the 2016 Olympic Games, she competed in the -69 kg division, winning a silver medal after losing to Sara Dosho in the final.

Vorobieva moved back up to the -72 kg division.  2019 was a very successful year for Vorobieva.  She won the -72 kg freestyle World title, beating Alina Stadnik Makhinia in the final, and the -76 kg title at the 2019 World Military Games, beating Wang Juan of China in the final.

In 2020, Vorobieva won the -72 kg freestyle European title, beating Maria Selmeier in the final. In March 2021, she qualified at the European Qualification Tournament to compete at the 2020 Summer Olympics in Tokyo, Japan. In June 2021, she won one of the bronze medals in her event at the 2021 Poland Open held in Warsaw, Poland.

Vorobyeva has also trained with UFC and M-1 Global MMA fighters, such as Khabib Nurmagomedov, Islam Makhachev, Vyacheslav Vasilevsky, Abubakar Nurmagomedov, Mikhail Malyutin and Ali Bagov.

References

External links
 

Living people
1991 births
Russian female sport wrestlers
Olympic wrestlers of Russia
Wrestlers at the 2012 Summer Olympics
Wrestlers at the 2016 Summer Olympics
Olympic medalists in wrestling
Olympic gold medalists for Russia
Olympic silver medalists for Russia
People from Tulun
Medalists at the 2012 Summer Olympics
Medalists at the 2016 Summer Olympics
Lezgins
European Games medalists in wrestling
European Games bronze medalists for Russia
Wrestlers at the 2015 European Games
World Wrestling Championships medalists
Wrestlers at the 2019 European Games
European Wrestling Championships medalists
Wrestlers at the 2020 Summer Olympics
European Wrestling Champions
Sportspeople from Irkutsk Oblast
20th-century Russian women
21st-century Russian women